Nawaf (Arabic:  نواف) is an Arabic name for males. People named Nawaf include:

 Nawaf Al-Ahmad Al-Jaber Al-Sabah, Emir of Kuwait
 Nawaf Salam, Lebanese diplomat, academic, and jurist
 Nawaf Falah, Iraqi footballer
 Nawaf Massalha, Israeli Arab politician
 Nawaf Al Abed, Saudi Arabian footballer

Arabic masculine given names